The Kasernierte Volkspolizei was the precursor to the National People's Army (NVA) in East Germany. Their original headquarters was in Adlershof locality in Berlin, and from 1954 in Strausberg in modern-day Brandenburg. 

They ceased to exist after 1956, having been transformed into the NVA, but are often confused with the later paramilitary police units, the Volkspolizei-Bereitschaft. 

The KVP was tasked with internal security operations since at the time, the Group of Soviet Forces in Germany was still mandated to provide external defenses for East Germany.

History

In October 1948, the Soviet Military Administration in Germany formed the Alert Police (Bereitschaftspolizei), a force of armed units housed in barracks and trained in military fashion. The force consisted of forty units with 100–250 men each, the units being subordinated to provincial authorities. Many of the officers and men were recruited from among German POWs held in the Soviet Union. 

In November 1948, the German Interior Administration (Deutschen Verwaltung des Innern, DVdI) took responsibility over the force (and the border troops) and included them in section named Hauptabteilung Grenzpolizei und Bereitschaften (HA GP/B). By the end of 1948, the force grew to 10,000 men.

The section was renamed to Verwaltung für Schulung (VfS) on 25 August 1949 to Hauptverwaltung für Ausbildung (HVA) on 15 October 1949 and to Kasernierte Volkspolizei (KVP) on 1 June 1952.

In December 1952, KVP membership had grown to 90,250. The ruling Socialist Unity Party of Germany and Soviet officers exercised strict ideological control over the force. In the same year, sea and air units were also included.

On 1 March 1956, the KVP units were transformed into the newly established army of East Germany, the NVA, and transferred to the Ministry of National Defence. 

Soon afterwards, the Ministry of Internal Affairs again formed its own paramilitary forcethe Volkspolizei-Bereitschaften. These were again armed as motorised infantry, with anti-tank weapons and so on, but were primarily employed on internal security and public order duties.

See also

 Alert police
 Bereitschaftspolizei
 B-Gendarmerie
 Bundesgrenzschutz
 History of the Volkspolizei

References

Military of East Germany
1948 establishments in Germany
National People's Army
Military units and formations established in 1948